The Borrowed Heaven Tour is the fourth concert tour by Irish band, the Corrs, Beginning summer 2004, the tour promoted the band's fourth studio album, Borrowed Heaven. With nearly 70 shows, the tour visited Europe and North America. It marks the first headlining tour for the band in North America. It also serves as the last headlining tour before the band went into hiatus.

Two new members joined the group during the tour – Jason Duffy on drums and Kieran Kiely on keyboards. Jason Duffy joined the band after Caroline Corr announced her pregnancy and was unable to cross the Atlantic Ocean for the North American leg. Caroline was moved to percussion which would be easier for her as the months progressed.

The 26 November 2004 show at the SEG Geneva Arena in Geneva, Switzerland was filmed and released on 13 December 2005. It was titled, "All the Way Home: A History of the Corrs (plus Live in Geneva)". The film contains a documentary on the history of the band along with the full concert from Geneva, made into a fantasy movie distributed by Warner Bros. Pictures.

Opening acts
Sophie B. Hawkins (6–21 August 2004)
Myslovitz (11 October–8 November 2004)
Tamee Harrison (Vienna)
Serena Ryder (Toronto)

Setlists
The following setlist was obtained from 30 August 2004 concert, held at the Theatre at the Air Canada Centre in Toronto, Canada. It does not represent all concerts during the tour. 
"Instrumental Sequence" (contains elements of "Baby Be Brave")
"Humdrum"
"Only When I Sleep"
"Dreams"
"What Can I Do"
"Forgiven, Not Forgotten"
"Angel"
"Runaway"
"Instrumental Sequence" (contains elements of "Return from Fingal" and "Trout in a Bath")
"Borrowed Heaven"
"No Frontiers"
"Queen of Hollywood"
"Long Night"
"Old Town"
"When the Stars Go Blue"
"Radio"
"Summer Sunshine"
"So Young"
"I Never Loved You Anyway"
"Goodbye"
Encore
"Breathless"
"Toss the Feathers"

Tour dates

Festivals and other miscellaneous performances

TW Classic
Killarney Summerfest
Moon and Stars
Montreux Jazz Festival
95.8 Capital FM's Party in the Park for the Prince's Trust
Liverpool Summer Pops
Festival de Musica Xacobeo
Ravinia Festival
BBC Proms in the Park
Top of the Mountain Concert

Cancellations and rescheduled shows

Personnel
Band
Andrea Corr (lead vocals, tin whistle)
Caroline Corr (percussion, bodhran, piano, vocals)
Jim Corr (guitars, keyboards, vocals)
Sharon Corr (violin, vocals)
Keith Duffy (bass)
Anthony Drennan (lead guitar)
Kieran Kiely (keyboards, accordion)
Jason Duffy (drums)

Management
John Hughes (band manager)
Barry Gaster (business management)
Caroline Henry (management assistant & band PA)

Crew
Henry McGroggan (tour manager)
Ian Calder (production manager)
Nicola Calder (production assistant)
Liam McCarthy (lighting designer)
Max Bisgrove (Front of House sound)
Paul Moore (monitor engineer)
Declan Hogan (drum technician)
David Vaughan (guitar technician)
Sound technicians
George Breacker
Jesse Godolphin
Mike Nichiman

Lighting technicians
Ray Whelan
Richard Griffin
Dave Prior
Paul Prior

Stylists
Jane Woolfenden (stylist)
Carly Morris (wardrobe)

Tour promoters
Konzertagentur GMBH – Germany
Clear Channel, Belgium – Belgium
Rock & More – Austria
Good News Productions & Montreaux Jazz Festival – Switzerland
Solo & CMP Entertament – United Kingdom 
Gamerco – Spain
Fona Artist – Mallorca
Rat des Villes – France
CPE Music – Portugal
Clear Channel, Italy – Italy
Denis Desmond- Ireland
Wonderland promoters – Northern Ireland

Instruments
Yamaha Drums
Zildjian Cymbals
Roland Keyboards
Barcus Berry Violins
EBS Bass Amps
Fender Guitars

References

The Corrs concert tours
2004 concert tours